The first elections to the newly created City of Bradford Metropolitan District Council were held on 10 May 1973, with the entirety of the 93 seat council - three seats for each of the 31 wards - up for vote. The Local Government Act 1972 stipulated that the elected members were to shadow and eventually take over from the predecessor corporation on 1 April 1974. The order in which the councillors were elected dictated their term serving, with third-place candidates serving two years and up for re-election in 1975, second-placed three years expiring in 1976 and 1st-placed five years until 1978.

As well as replacing the County Borough of Bradford, the new council included:

Municipal Borough of Keighley
Baildon Urban District
Bingley Urban District
Denholme Urban District
Ilkley Urban District
Queensbury and Shelf Urban District (part)
Shipley Urban District
Silsden Urban District
Skipton Rural District (part)

The election resulted in the Conservatives gaining control.

Election result

This result had the following consequences for the total number of seats on the Council after the elections:

Ward results

References

1973 English local elections
1973
1970s in West Yorkshire